Been So Long is a 2018 musical film directed by Tinge Krishnan based on the musical of the same name, with a screenplay written by Ché Walker.

It is based on a musical premiered at the Young Vic on July 11, 2009, which was itself based on the 1998 play of the same name.

The film was released on 26 October 2018 by Netflix.

Premise
Simone, a single mother,  meets and falls in love with a handsome stranger named Raymond while out for a rare night on the town with her friends. The questions the film poses are: Can Simone loosen her heart to let someone get close to her? and does Raymond, who is on parole from prison, deserve her trust? There are storylines about Simone's disabled daughter; her daughter's estranged father, and Simone's relationship with her best friend.  In the background, Raymond is being stalked by a wild knife wielding young man. It is set in Camden Town, London, with scenes in Camden Market, Regent's Canal, and Primrose Hill.

Cast
Michaela Coel as Simone
Arinzé Kene as Raymond
George MacKay as Gil
Joe Dempsie as Kestrel
Luke Norris as Barney
Arsher Ali as Jake
Rakie Ayola as Martina
Ronkẹ Adékoluẹjo as Yvonne
Ashley Thomas as Wendell
Sophia La Porta as Willesden
Tom Forbes as Conrad
Mark Wingett as Bailiff
Genevieve Barr as Artemis

Production
In May 2017, it was announced that principal production of the film had concluded in London, UK. In September 2017, Netflix bought worldwide rights to the film, in what was a "multi-million dollar deal",  believed to be Netflix's largest single acquisition of a U.K. film in its history at the time.

Soundtrack

The musical score for Been So Long was composed by Christopher Nicholas Bangs, and features music from the film’s stars.

The digital album was released through Virgin EMI Records on 26 October 2018.

Release
It was released on October 26, 2018 by Netflix.

Reception 
On Metacritic, the film has a weighted average score of 74 out of 100, based on 5 critics, indicating "generally favorable reviews".

References

External links
 

2018 films
2010s musical films
English-language Netflix original films
Black British films
Films based on musicals
British musical films
2010s English-language films
2010s British films